The Iraqi Premier Football League, or simply the Iraqi Premier League, is the top level of the Iraqi football league system. Contested by 20 clubs, it is operated by the Iraq Football Association (IFA) and operates on a system of promotion and relegation with the Iraq Division One.

The league was formed by the IFA in 1974 as the Iraqi National Clubs First Division, the first nationwide league of clubs in Iraq. The current format sees 20 teams playing 38 matches each (playing each team in the league twice, home and away), totalling 380 matches in the season.

Of the 80 teams to have competed since the inception of the league in 1974, eleven have won the title. Al-Zawraa are the most successful club with 14 titles, followed by Al-Quwa Al-Jawiya, Al-Talaba and Al-Shorta, who together contest the Baghdad derbies. The current champions are Al-Shorta, who won the title in 2021–22.

History

Origins 

Up until 1973, leagues in Iraq were played at a regional level. The Central FA League, the Basra League and the Kirkuk League were all founded in 1948, while the Mosul League was founded in 1950. The first nationwide league to be held in the country was in the 1973–74 season when the National First Division was formed, with Al-Quwa Al-Jawiya being crowned champions. The IFA then decided to replace the competition with a new National Clubs First Division which would only be open to clubs and not institute-representative teams.

Foundation 
The league held its first season in 1974–75 and was originally composed of ten clubs. The first ever Iraqi Premier League goal was scored by Falah Hassan of Al-Tayaran (now known as Al-Quwa Al-Jawiya) in a 1–1 draw with Al-Sinaa. Al-Tayaran were crowned champions of the inaugural season which featured the following teams:

"Baghdad's Big Four" dominance 

Ever since the Iraqi Premier League began, it has been dominated by the four biggest clubs in Baghdad: Al-Quwa Al-Jawiya, Al-Shorta, Al-Talaba and Al-Zawraa, who together contest the Baghdad derbies. From the 1989–90 season until the 2005–06 season, the league was won by one of the four Baghdad teams every time. After the 2003 US invasion of Iraq, players started to leave the Baghdad-based clubs and join clubs in the North such as Erbil and Duhok due to the poor security situation in the capital city. This led to a shift in the dominance of the "Big Four" as Erbil won three consecutive league titles from 2007 to 2009 with Duhok winning the league in 2010. In the 2008–09 season, none of Baghdad's Big Four clubs finished in the top four and this is the only time that this has happened in the history of the league; the top four spots were occupied by Erbil, Al-Najaf, Duhok and Al-Amana. However, Baghdad's Big Four have since returned to dominating the league, having won all titles since 2015–16.

Corporate structure 
The Premier League is operated by the Iraq Football Association, which is directly involved in the day-to-day operations of the Premier League and has full control over new rules adopted by the league.

Competition format

Competition 
There are currently 20 clubs in the Iraqi Premier League. During the course of a season, each club plays the others twice (a double round-robin system), once at their home stadium and once at that of their opponents, for a total of 38 games (however, matches between Baghdad's Big Four clubs are played at the neutral venue of Al-Shaab Stadium to accommodate more spectators). Teams receive three points for a win and one point for a draw. No points are awarded for a loss. Teams are ranked by total points, then head-to-head points, then head-to-head goal difference, then total goal difference, then number of wins and then goals scored. If still equal, teams are deemed to occupy the same position. If there is a tie for the championship, for relegation, or for qualification to other competitions, a play-off match at a neutral venue decides rank.

The two teams at the bottom of the table are relegated to the Iraq Division One, while the top two teams in the Division One are promoted. The 18th-placed team in the table and the third-placed team in the Division One play a play-off match, with the winner playing the next season in the Premier League and the loser in the Division One. Each club must register a squad of 35 players and can use up to five players from their youth team. Each club is allowed a maximum of six foreign outfield players, of which up to five can play at any given time. A maximum of five substitutions are available per match for each team. The winners of the league qualify for the Iraqi Super Cup, a match played against the winners of the Iraq FA Cup (if the league winners also win the Iraq FA Cup, they play the league runners-up instead).

Number of teams

Clubs

2022–23 season
Twenty clubs compete in the 2022–23 Iraqi Premier League, including three promoted from the Division One:

a: Founding member of the Iraqi Premier League
b: Never been relegated from the Iraqi Premier League

Seasons in Premier League
80 teams have taken part in at least a single round of the Iraqi Premier League since its first season in 1974–75 up until the 2022–23 season (not counting the qualifying rounds of the 2000–01 season). The teams in bold are competing in the Iraqi Premier League in the 2022–23 season. Al-Quwa Al-Jawiya and Al-Shorta are the only teams to have played in every single one of the 49 Iraqi Premier League seasons.

Notes

Champions

International competitions

Qualification for Asian competitions

Qualification criteria for 2022 

From the 2021–22 season, the champions of the Premier League qualify for the subsequent season's AFC Champions League group stage, while the league runners-up qualify for the AFC Cup group stage alongside the winner of the Iraq FA Cup. If the cup winners are also the league winners or runners-up, the third-placed team in the league qualifies for the AFC Cup group stage. The winners of the AFC Champions League and AFC Cup may earn an additional qualification for the subsequent season's AFC Champions League qualifying play-offs if they have not already qualified.

The number of places allocated to Iraqi clubs in AFC competitions is dependent upon the position the country holds in the AFC Club Competitions Ranking, which is calculated based upon the performance of teams in AFC competitions in the previous four years.

Previous performance 

Collectively, Iraqi teams have reached nine finals of Asian club competitions. Before the foundation of the Iraqi Premier League, Aliyat Al-Shorta were the first Iraqi team to participate in the Asian Club Championship in 1971 and they reached the final, but they refused to play Israeli side Maccabi Tel Aviv and took the runner-up spot. Al-Rasheed became the first Iraqi Premier League club to reach the final of the Asian Club Championship in 1989 but they lost a two-legged final on away goals to Al-Saad of Qatar. Al-Talaba reached the final of the 1995 Asian Cup Winners' Cup but they lost it 2–1 to Bellmare Hiratsuka, and five years later, Al-Zawraa lost the final of the same competition 1–0 to Shimizu S-Pulse in 2000. Erbil reached the final of Asia's second-tier tournament, the AFC Cup, twice in 2012 and 2014 but lost both times to Al-Kuwait and Al-Qadsia respectively. Al-Quwa Al-Jawiya managed to win the AFC Cup when they beat Indian club Bengaluru FC 1–0 in the 2016 final, and they won the competition for the second consecutive season in 2017 by beating FC Istiklol by the same scoreline. They earned a record third AFC Cup title in a row with a 2–0 defeat of Altyn Asyr in 2018.

Performance in Arab competitions
The Premier League champions also qualify for the Arab Club Champions Cup alongside the league runners-up, while the league's third-placed team is admitted into the Arab Club Champions Cup qualifying play-offs.

Al-Shorta won the inaugural Arab Club Champions Cup in 1982 by defeating Al-Nejmeh 4–2 on aggregate in the final. Meanwhile, Al-Rasheed won the Arab Club Champions Cup three times in a row in 1985, 1986 and 1987 and are the competition's joint-most successful side.

Sponsorship
The league was founded as the National Clubs First Division and has been renamed several times, with the current Premier League name remaining in place since 2013. The competition has had title sponsorship rights sold to three companies, which were Zain Iraq in the 2009–10 season, Asiacell in the 2010–11 and 2011–12 seasons and Fuchs in the 2015–16 season.

Players

Top scorers

Italics denotes players still playing professional football,Bold denotes players still playing in the Iraqi Premier League.

Awards

Trophy

The current Iraqi Premier League trophy has been in use since the 2009–10 season and was designed by Iraq Football Association member Zuhair Nadhum, with the design being implemented by Qahtan Salim. The materials used to make the trophy were imported from China.

The trophy is a flat shield, predominantly golden in colour. In the centre of the shield is a football made from golden and mirrored pieces, with a map of Iraq in the centre of the ball. Inside the map reads the word Iraq in Arabic, with the words Premier League Shield underneath (also in Arabic) completed with the season. Surrounding the football are the words Iraq Football Association written in Arabic at the top and in English at the bottom in silver text. Surrounding that text is another ring, the top half of which contains the flag of Iraq and the bottom half of which contains 18 golden stars, representing the 18 provinces of Iraq. Connecting the two halves of the outer ring on both sides is the IFA's logo.

Records

League records
Titles
Most titles: 14, Al-Zawraa
Most consecutive title wins: 3 – joint record:
Al-Zawraa twice (1993–94, 1994–95, 1995–96 and 1998–99, 1999–2000, 2000–01)
Al-Rasheed (1986–87, 1987–88, 1988–89)
Erbil (2006–07, 2007–08, 2008–09)
Biggest title-winning margin: 21 points, 2021–22; Al-Shorta (91 points) over Al-Quwa Al-Jawiya (70 points)
Smallest title-winning margin: 0 points, 0 goal difference and 2 wins – 1980–81; Al-Talaba (8 wins) over Al-Shorta (6 wins)
Earliest title win with the most games remaining: 7 games, Al-Shorta (2021–22)

Wins
Most consecutive wins: 11, Al-Shorta (13 March – 22 May 1998)
Most consecutive wins from the start of a season: 9 – joint record:
Erbil (2008–09)
Al-Zawraa (2017–18)
Most consecutive wins to the end of a season: 11, Al-Shorta (1997–98)
Defeated all league opponents at least once in a season: joint record:
Al-Tayaran (1974–75, 9 opponents)
Al-Zawraa (2000–01, 15 opponents)
Al-Shorta (2021–22, 19 opponents)

Losses
Fewest losses in a season: 0 – joint record:
Al-Zawraa four times (1976–77, 11 rounds, 1978–79, 12 rounds, 2005–06, 19 rounds, 2015–16, 24 rounds)
Al-Jamiea (1976–77, 11 rounds)
Al-Minaa (1977–78, 13 rounds)
Al-Shorta (1980–81, 11 rounds)
Salahaddin (1982–83, 22 rounds)
Al-Jaish (1983–84, 24 rounds)
Longest unbeaten run: 39 games – joint record:
Al-Zawraa (25 November 1993 – 3 October 1994)
Al-Shorta (21 May 2018 – 23 May 2019)

Goals
Most consecutive matches scored in: 37, Al-Shorta (13 October 1997 – 13 November 1998)
Most consecutive matches without conceding a goal: 14, Erbil (16 July 2009 – 20 March 2010)
Scored in every match during a season: joint record:
Al-Shorta twice (1980–81, 11 rounds, and 1997–98, 30 rounds)
Al-Zawraa (1976–77, 11 rounds)
Al-Minaa (1977–78, 13 rounds)
Karbalaa (2005–06, 16 rounds)

Match records

Scorelines
Biggest win: joint record:
Al-Naqil 11–0 Al-Shorta (12 October 1974)
Al-Ramadi 11–0 Kirkuk (15 May 1995)

Attendances
Highest attendance, single game: 68,000, Al-Shorta v. Al-Zawraa (at Al-Shaab Stadium, 13 December 1991)

Player records

Appearances
Youngest player: Amjad Kalaf, 13 years and 101 days (for Al-Kut v. Al-Basra, 14 January 2005)

Titles
Most Premier League titles: 7 – joint record:
Salam Hashim (three with Al-Rasheed in 1986–87, 1987–88 and 1988–89 and four with Al-Zawraa in 1990–91, 1993–94, 1994–95 and 1995–96)
Mohamed Jassim Mahdi (seven with Al-Zawraa in 1990–91, 1993–94, 1994–95, 1995–96, 1998–99, 1999–2000, 2000–01)
Most Premier League titles as captain: 3 – joint record:
Hazem Jassam (three with Al-Zawraa in 1975–76, 1976–77 and 1978–79)
Ahmed Radhi (one with Al-Rasheed in 1988–89 and two with Al-Zawraa in 1990–91 and 1998–99)
Rafid Badr Al-Deen (three with Erbil in 2006–07, 2007–08 and 2008–09)

Goals
Most Premier League goals: 177, Sahib Abbas
Most Premier League goals for one club: 149, Ali Hashim (for Al-Najaf)
Most top scorer awards: 4, Karim Saddam (1988–89, 1989–90, 1990–91, 1992–93)
Most consecutive top scorer awards: 3 – joint record:
Rahim Hameed (1985–86, 1986–87, 1987–88)
Karim Saddam (1988–89, 1989–90, 1990–91)
Most goals in a season: 36, Younis Abid Ali (1993–94, 50 rounds)
Most goals in a single game: 6 – joint record:
Shakir Mohammed Sabbar (for Al-Ramadi v. Kirkuk, 15 May 1995)
Sahib Abbas (for Al-Zawraa v. Al-Karkh, 18 October 1996)
Alaa Kadhim (for Al-Talaba v. Al-Mosul, 9 January 1998)
Fastest goal: 7 seconds, Alaa Abdul-Sattar (for Al-Zawraa v. Al-Kadhimiya, 25 January 2002)
Most Premier League hat-tricks: 10 – joint record:
Qahtan Chathir
Sahib Abbas
Most Premier League hat-tricks in a season: 4, Qahtan Chathir (Al-Karkh, 1999–2000)

Managerial records

Titles
The following managers have won multiple Iraqi Premier League titles:

See also 
 List of Iraqi football champions
 Iraqi clubs in the AFC Club Competitions
 Iraqi Women's Football League

References

External links 
Official website 
Iraq Football Association

 
1
Sports leagues established in 1974
1974 establishments in Iraq
Iraq